Ma Junsheng (born 15 August 1961) is a Chinese politician who it the current director of the State Post Bureau, in office since November 2006.

He was a member of the 11th and 12th National Committee of the Chinese People's Political Consultative Conference.

Biography
Ma was born in Ningyang County, Shandong, on 15 August 1961, and graduated from Nanjing University of Posts and Telecommunications. He joined the Chinese Communist Party (CCP) in July 1991. He was assigned to the Ministry of Posts and Telecommunications in April 1996, In September 1998, he became deputy director of the State Post Bureau in September 1998, rising to director in November 2006.

References

1961 births
Living people
People from Ningyang County
Nanjing University of Posts and Telecommunications alumni
People's Republic of China politicians from Shandong
Chinese Communist Party politicians from Shandong
Members of the 11th Chinese People's Political Consultative Conference
Members of the 12th Chinese People's Political Consultative Conference
Members of the 14th Chinese People's Political Consultative Conference